The 2013 NCAA Division I Men's Swimming and Diving Championships were contested in March 2013 at the Indiana University Natatorium in Indianapolis, Indiana at the 90th annual NCAA-sanctioned swim meet to determine the team and individual national champions of Division I men's collegiate swimming and diving in the United States.

Michigan topped the team standings, finishing 73.5 points ahead of two-time defending champions California. It was the Wolverines' then-record twelfth men's team title and first since 1995.

Team standings
Note: Top 10 only
(DC) = Defending champions
Full results

See also
List of college swimming and diving teams

References

NCAA Division I Men's Swimming and Diving Championships
NCAA Division I Swimming And Diving Championships
NCAA Division I Men's Swimming And Diving Championships
NCAA Division I Men's Swimming and Diving Championships